Rolf Gindorf (14 May 1939 – 26 March 2016) was a German sexologist. He was a member of Mensa. In 1971 he founded the German Society for Social-Scientific Sexuality Research.
	
He received the 2004 Magnus Hirschfeld Medal.

Publications 

Gindorf's published works include:

 Sexology Today. A Brief Introduction. Düsseldorf 1993, 141 pp. (with E. J. Haeberle)
 Bisexualities. The Ideology and Practice of Sexual Contact with Both Men and Women. New York 1998, 270 pp. (with E. J. Haeberle)

References

External links

 Rolf Gindorf English web site
 DGSS (Sexuality Research) English web site
 DGSS Institute (Sexual and Gay Counseling) English web site
 American Academy of Clinical Sexologists

1939 births
2016 deaths
German gay writers
German sexologists
Mensans
Relationships and sexuality writers
Sex educators